Eucamptognathus insolitus is a species of ground beetle in the subfamily Pterostichinae. It was described by Mateu in 1958.

References

Eucamptognathus
Beetles described in 1958